is a city located in north-central Hiroshima Prefecture, Japan.

As of April 1, 2011, the city has a population of 31,565, with 13,223 households and a population density of 59 persons per km². of The total area is 538.17 km².

The modern city of Akitakata was established on March 1, 2004, from the merger of the towns of Kōda, Midori, Mukaihara, Takamiya, Yachiyo and Yoshida (all from Takata District). Therefore, Takata District was dissolved as a result of this merger.

It is a mountainous farming area known for many traditional events as well as certain food products.

One such food product is Ebisu tea, a sweet fragrant tea, that comes from Mukaihara Town. Another is yuzu juice (柚子ジュース), a product of the Kawane area of Takamiya town in the northeastern part of the city.

The city also lays claim to be the birthplace and hometown of Mōri Motonari, the Warring States-era daimyō of the 16th century.

History
The area of Akitakata City was originally known as Takata District (高田郡), which combined 26 villages into a single administrative unit on April 1, 1889.

The area now known as Akitakata was the site of a number of fortifications during the period when Mori Motonari fought against the Amago clan. Mori Motonari himself was born in Suzuo Castle (鈴尾城) in 1497, the remains of which are in the town of Yoshida. In 1500, Motonari's father, Mōri Hiromoto (毛利弘元) retired to Tajihi-Sarugake Castle (多治比猿掛城), about 4 kilometers north of the family's base in Yoshida-Kōriyama Castle (郡山城), both of whose remains are also in Yoshida town. Motonari would remain based here until the age of 27 when he would return to the family base in Yoshida-Kōriyama Castle.

Ikenouchi (池の内) in Koda was the site of a battle against the Amago clan on September 26, 1540. The Amago clan was defeated, and it is said that the leader, Yubara Yajirō (湯原弥二郎) committed seppuku there. A monument commemorates the occasion. Koda is also the site of the remains of Goryū castle (五龍城), of the Shishido clan (宍戸氏).The family would become tied to the Mori clan with the marriage of Motonari's eldest daughter to Shishido Takaie (宍戸隆家).

Culture
Kagura, an ancient traditional form of Shinto dance and music, is still alive there today. The towns of Midori and Takamiya practice the "new dance" style, which is not actually new at all, just a later emergent performance style compared to the "old style". (There is a Kagura village in Midori town called Kaguramonzentojimura where various Kagura performances and competitions begin in August and last until December.)

Akitakata City is in the countryside, and still maintains many traditional local festivals. One such is Hanadaue, or rice-planting festival where men play flutes and taiko while women sing and plant rice.

Notable places
Yoshida-Kōriyama Castle : Prime castle of the Mōri clan
Tajihi-Sarugake Castle : A castle ruin, Mōri Motonari spent 23 years in the castle.
Akitakata City Historical Museum
TS-Takata Circuit

Hiroshima vote-buying scandal
The mayor of Akitakata, Hiroshi Kodama, admitted receiving 600,000 yen from former Minister of Justice Katsuyuki Kawai and appeared at a news conference on 26 June 2020 with a shaved head to express his remorse. He resigned a week later, having stayed in office for only two and a half months. Other recipients of the cash gifts included several elected representatives in the city, amongst them the Speaker and the vice-Speaker of the Municipal Assembly.

References

External links

 Akitakata City official website 
 Kagura Village in Midori 

Cities in Hiroshima Prefecture